Barry Munday (alternatively known as Family Jewels) is a 2010 American comedy film directed by Chris D'Arienzo; it is based on the novel Life is a Strange Place by Frank Turner Hollon. It is D'Arienzo's directorial debut. The film stars Patrick Wilson as the title character, as well as Judy Greer, Chloë Sevigny, Jean Smart, Shea Whigham, Missi Pyle, Christopher McDonald, Billy Dee Williams and Malcolm McDowell. The story revolves around a womanizer waking up to find his testicles have disappeared and is facing a paternity lawsuit by a woman he can't remember having sex with. The film premiered at the South by Southwest Film Festival on March 13, 2010, got picked up by Magnolia Pictures and was given a limited release on October 1. Barry Munday garnered negative reviews from critics who praised Wilson's performance but criticized D'Arienzo's quirky filmmaking leading the vulgar material.

Plot

Barry Munday (Patrick Wilson), a lonely womanizer, wakes up after being attacked to realize that he's missing his "family jewels". To make matters worse, he learns he's facing a paternity lawsuit filed by a woman, Ginger (Judy Greer), he can't remember having sex with. Though unintentional, the two discover that their meeting and subsequent "accidents" opened up new opportunities for personal growth and relationships.

Cast

Patrick Wilson as Barry Munday
Judy Greer as Ginger Farley
Chloë Sevigny as Jennifer Farley
Jean Smart as Carol Munday
Cybill Shepherd as Mrs. Farley
Malcolm McDowell as Mr. Farley
Shea Whigham as Donald
Missi Pyle as Lida Griggs
Billy Dee Williams as Lonnie Green
Christopher McDonald as Dr. Preston Edwards
Colin Hanks as Heavy Metal Greg
Mae Whitman as Candice
Kyle Gass as Jerry Sherman from Barry's support group
Barret Swatek as Lucy
Trieu Tran as Moe
Razaaq Adoti as Spiro
Emily Procter as Deborah
Matt Winston as Kyle Pennington
Sam Pancake as D.J.
Bruna Rubio as Sasha

Release
On February 4, 2010, Barry Munday was selected as one of the Spotlight Premieres for the 2010 South by Southwest Film Festival, and made its world premiere on March 13. Magnolia Pictures bought the film's distribution rights after its premiere at SXSW, first releasing it on August 27 as part of its Ultra VOD program, and giving it a limited release on October 1.

Reception
Barry Munday received negative reviews from critics. Metacritic gave the film a score of 28 out of 100, based on six critics, indicating "generally unfavorable reviews".

Eric Kohn of IndieWire praised Wilson's "gentle, unassuming performance" for making the title character "work[s] well enough to generate a steady volume of pathos" but felt the film suffered from "an ever-present lightness despite its vulgar nature," criticizing D'Arienzo's screenplay for containing "a constant barrage of personal gripes and directionless vulgarity that lacks enough ingenuity" to elevate the film's light-hearted tone that "occasionally manages to create a gently bittersweet vibe due to this decisive blend." He concluded that the film's positive elements "simply fail to compensate for the greater lack of competence needed to excuse the shoddy, half-baked plot. The movie's forgettable qualities set it up for a put-down on its own lame terms: "Barry" is mundane." A writer for The Hollywood Reporter called it "a frumpy version of "Knocked Up" playing out in a sadder, stranger world," praising Wilson for giving "another successful against-type performance," but felt the "garish and unfashionable" production choices alleviate the seriousness of the story's overall tone, saying "the film's focus on some pretty unappealing quirks limits its commercial appeal." Variety film critic Joe Leydon gave praise to both Wilson and Greer for being "almost too convincing" and giving "some welcome emotional truth" to their respective roles but was critical of D'Arienzo for overusing his supporting cast and laying "the self-conscious quirkiness" thick in his "uneven but modestly diverting indie" film.

Robert Abele of the Los Angeles Times commended Wilson for portraying the title character with "admirable comic understatement" and the film for having "acceptable heart tugs towards the end", but concluded that: "D'Arienzo's love of trite indie-movie signposts of comic quirkiness — deadpan delivery, overly formal camerawork, characters delivering dialogue into the camera, stunt casting (Billy Dee Williams as Wilson's boss) — is ultimately regrettable." Scott Tobias of NPR also commended Wilson for giving the titular character "a puppy-dog eagerness that's refreshing in its total lack of vanity" but felt the film was "a deeply off-putting independent comedy," criticizing D'Arienzo's direction of Greer's character into being "irredeemably, almost inhumanly nasty" and the "egregious stunt casting" of his supporting actors, saying "Barry Munday clashes as violently as its retro-patterned sweaters and hideously ornate wallpaper." Nathan Rabin of The A.V. Club gave it a "D+" grade, criticizing D'Arienzo for ignoring the movie's overall message and replaced it with "random wackiness, distracting stunt casting, and Napoleon Dynamite-style production design." He concluded that "this sluggishly paced quirkfest is awfully sophomoric for a film all about giving up the facile thrills of youth for the responsibilities of adulthood."

References

External links
 
 
 
 

2010 films
2010 comedy films
2010 directorial debut films
2010 independent films
2010 romantic comedy films
2010 romantic comedy-drama films
2010s American films
2010s English-language films
2010s pregnancy films
2010s sex comedy films
American comedy films
American independent films
American pregnancy films
American romantic comedy-drama films
American sex comedy films
Films based on American novels
Films set in Los Angeles
Films shot in Los Angeles